The 2000 Philippine Basketball Association (PBA) Commissioner's Cup was the second conference of the 2000 PBA season. It started on June 23 and ended on September 15, 2000. The tournament is an Import-laden format, which requires an import or a pure-foreign player for each team.

Format
The following format will be observed for the duration of the conference:
 One-round robin eliminations; 9 games per team; Teams are then seeded by basis on win–loss records. 
 The top eight teams after the eliminations will advance to the quarterfinals.
Quarterfinals:
Top four teams will have a twice-to-beat advantage against their opponent.
QF1: #1 vs. #8
QF2: #2 vs. #7
QF3: #3 vs. #6
QF4: #4 vs. #5
Best-of-five semifinals:
SF1: QF1 vs. QF4
SF2: QF2 vs. QF3
Third-place playoff: losers of the semifinals
Best-of-seven finals: winners of the semifinals

Imports
The following is the list of imports with the replacement imports being highlighted. GP is the number of games played in the conference.

(*) Played only in Purefoods' seventh game in the eliminations until Nwosu returns in their last two games.

Elimination round

Team standings

Bracket

Quarterfinals

(1) San Miguel vs. (8) Barangay Ginebra

(2) Sta. Lucia vs. (7) Sunkist

(3) Tanduay vs, (6) Mobiline

(4) Alaska vs. (5) Purefoods

Semifinals

(1) San Miguel vs. (4) Alaska

(2) Sta. Lucia vs. (3) Tanduay

Third place playoff

Finals

References

External links
 PBA.ph

Commissioner's Cup
PBA Commissioner's Cup